Shearmur is a surname. Notable people with the surname include:

Allison Shearmur (1963–2018), American film executive and producer
Edward Shearmur (born 1966), British film composer
Jeremy Shearmur, Australian academic